Euclid Avenue School is a historic school building located at Jamestown in Chautauqua County, New York. It is a two-story, rectangular brick structure built in 1911 and enlarged in 1920 and 1956.   The structure combines Neoclassical features and proportions with elements of the Spanish Mission and American Craftsman styles in an eclectic composition that is characteristic of early 20th-century architectural fashion.

It was listed on the National Register of Historic Places in 1985.

References

External links
Euclid Avenue School - Jamestown, New York - U.S. National Register of Historic Places on Waymarking.com

Jamestown, New York
School buildings on the National Register of Historic Places in New York (state)
Neoclassical architecture in New York (state)
School buildings completed in 1911
School buildings completed in 1956
Buildings and structures in Chautauqua County, New York
National Register of Historic Places in Chautauqua County, New York
1911 establishments in New York (state)